Emma Kaye is the founder and CEO of a full funded startup venture called Bozza.

Emma has a number of seminal (and enduring) business and industry ventures to her name, and attained multiple professional accolades and leading-light endorsements in the course of a steadily evolving, outwardly mercurial-seeming career spanning only 15 years. She draws attention to the strong business underpinning of her work, pointing out that her involvement has twice had the result of giving sustainable business direction and African brand equity to a highly charged, emerging sector.

Education and career 
Emma Kaye was born in Harare, Zimbabwe. On completing her A'Levels she studied business, marketing and computer programming at Oxford Brookes University, England and from there moved to the London School of Economics. During her time in London, Emma worked in financial PR and wrote short term money management programs for the money markets.

In 1991, having worked in financial PR and software development for some time, she began work as a production coordinator in feature films – the first being production secretary for Bopha (directed by Morgan Freeman and featuring Danny Glover and Alfre Woodard).

In 1996 Emma co-founded Triggerfish Animation, a South African animation company, with director Jacquie Trowell. During eight years as its executive producer, she produced award-winning commercials and seminal television programs such as Takalani Sesame, the largest animation production and collaborative initiative in SA to date. As a result of Takalani’s success, Sesame Workshop commissioned Triggerfish to produce animation for their US domestic and international programming. Triggerfish’s work has won awards and nominations at festivals and markets around the globe. It was the birthing of Africa as a brand within animation.

In order to inject sustainability into the African animation brand, she initiated the first Animation Festival at Sithengi 2002, and co-founded animationsa.org and animationxchange. After seeking government and industry support for the local film industry for a considerable period before that, Emma personally financed Sithengi for two years, with predictable outcome.

Emma co-produced South Africa’s first animated documentary (Beyond Freedom directed by Jacqui Trowell) that was solicited by National Geographic through the All Roads Film Project. The film premiered in Los Angeles and Washington DC, screened at prestigious festivals, including Toronto, and was nominated for a Golden Bear award (Berlin).
With a growing vision of new media as the primary way forward in entertainment, Emma joined  Breakdesign (Oct 2005), a studio that creates content and applications for mobile phones, as its CEO. Breakdesign, became the top 5 Flash Lite developers globally for Nokia. In April 2007 Emma left Breakdesign to continue her work in content creation, new media, mobile and entertainment, starting with the debut African mobile content and user generated mobile channels, Mobfest. In May 2007 Emma founded Gate7, a new media, content and mobility company featuring three main streams of involvement: mobile consulting in the business of entertainment and social community; full implementation capacity of mobile strategies; and ground breaking social development, utilizing the mobile platform.

In July 2008, Emma pioneered and launched South Africa’s first mobile text channel - serialized fiction on phones - Novel Idea. This has taken entertainment into the world of texting, a huge success in the textcentric society of the South Africa landscape.

Emma has presented at countless conferences across the globe to spread her thoughts, contributed to the writing of industry papers, participated in many festivals and conferences on the continent and across the globe, and set up regional SA chapters of industry bodies.

In August 2013, Emma founded and launched Bozza. Bozza is an online market place for Africa's musicians and artists. Using the platform, artists can sell their work directly to their public, and create a platform for their work.

References

Alumni of Oxford Brookes University
Living people
Year of birth missing (living people)